Conus sunderlandi is a species of sea snail, a marine gastropod mollusk in the family Conidae, the cone snails and their allies.

Like all species within the genus Conus, these marine snails are predatory and venomous. They are capable of "stinging" humans, therefore live ones should be handled carefully or not at all.

Description 
Original description: "Shell stocky, solid, broad across shoulder; shoulder sharp-angled; body whorl smooth and shiny; anterior tip with several strong spiral cords; shell color white, overlaid with numerous close-packed rows of tiny, bright orange, vertical flammules; mid-body with white band; anterior tip white, with few scattered tiny, orange flammules; bands of orange vertical flammules sometimes coalesce to form solid orange, wide band (as in paratypes shown in Figures 15, 16); spire whorls white, with numerous, closely-packed, bright orange, crescent-shaped flammules; interior of aperture pink; periostracum  thin, smooth, yellow."

The maximum recorded shell length is 33 mm.

Distribution
Locus typicus: "Off Utila Isl, Bay Islands, Honduras."

This species occurs in the Caribbean Sea off Honduras.

Habitat 
Minimum recorded depth is 18 m. Maximum recorded depth is 18 m.

References

 Tucker J.K. & Tenorio M.J. (2009) Systematic classification of Recent and fossil conoidean gastropods. Hackenheim: Conchbooks. 296 pp.
  Puillandre N., Duda T.F., Meyer C., Olivera B.M. & Bouchet P. (2015). One, four or 100 genera? A new classification of the cone snails. Journal of Molluscan Studies. 81: 1–23

External links
 The Conus Biodiversity website
 Cone Shells – Knights of the Sea
 

sunderlandi
Gastropods described in 1987